Ghogha is a census town in Bhavnagar district in the state of Gujarat, India. It is situated on the mid-western bank of the Gulf of Khambhat. It was an important historical commercial port on the Arabian Sea until the development of nearby Bhavnagar in the nineteenth century.

Etymology
The name Gogha has been traced to the famous Rajput warrior and hero Gogobava. There is an old mosque which is since 15th century and it is believed that companions of Muhammad came from the Arabian Sea. A more likely derivation is from the shell, goghala, common along the coast.

Demographics
In 1872, it had a population of 9,571.

As of the 2011 census of India, Ghogha had a population of 12,208; 49% male and 51% female, and 12.71% of the population was under 6 years of age. The average literacy rate was 70% (below the national average of 74.4%) with male literacy being 77%, and female literacy 63%.

Historical information
The port of Gogha has been active since the 5th century CE and flourished as a major trading post during the 10th to 16th century CE before Bhavnagar took the place of Gogha as a trading centre. Being located at a strategic position in the Gulf, Gogha has always been an important trading centre and consequently been attacked several times and captured by local rulers like Gohel Rajputs and Muslims during the medieval period (Bell, 1980:73).  Stone anchors have been found there from several locations along the Indian coast such as Dabhol (Gaur et al. 2007b) Sindhudurg (Sila and Gaur, 1997) and Vijaydurg (Sila et al., 1998), and have been dated to between the 8th and 14th centuries CE.

The Imperial Gazetteer of India (1908:301) mentions that "the natives of this town are reckoned the best sailors or lascars in India. The ships touching here may procure water and supplies or repair damage".  A famous proverb about Gogha is "Lankan Ladi ane Ghoghono var" (Bride of Lanka and groom of Gogha) which perhaps indicates some kind of direct overseas relation between Gogha and Sri Lanka. According to the historical account, Arabs established a colony at Gogha in 636 CE, though the earliest Arabic inscription found at Gogha dates to 1170 CE. Ancient Jain temples at Gogha from the 10th or 11th centuries suggest that it was also a religious centre.  During the British period, ships up to 1500 tons were laden here. Pinkerton (1811) mentions that Gogha provided a harbour for the largest ships, though they would lie dry on mud at low water.  Gogha served as a port for Cambay, loaded and unloaded with the aid of lighters, since Cambay was open only to very small vessels, e.g. boats called tawri (Habib, 1982) of up to 80 tons.

History
Ghogha was known as the port of Gundigar during Maitraka rule of Vallabhi (AD 480-720). Under Chaulukya dynasty rule (746-1297), except as a nursery for seamen, Ghogha was not a place of any note. One of the earliest mentions of the town is by French explorer Friar Jordanus, who, in 1321, passing north through Thane and Bharuch or as he writes it Parocco, stayed at 'Gogo'. Of the place he has left no details. At this time Ghogha is said to have been in the hands of Muslim soldiers of fortune, from whom, a few years later (1325), Mokhadaji Gohil, the Gohil chief of Umrala, took it and with the Piram Island made it his headquarters. As ruler of Piram, Mokhadaji levied toll from all ships passing up the Gulf. His exactions came to the knowledge of the emperor Muhammad bin Tughluq (1325-1351), then quelling a revolt in Gujarat, and, in 1347, Gogha was taken, Mokhadaji killed, and the Piram fort destroyed. The Emperor, satisfied with the destruction of Piram, left Gogha, at this time 'a great city with large markets,' in the hands of Dungarji, Mokhadaji's son. For about fifty years the Gohils held Ghogha. Near the close of the century (1390) they were forced to pay tribute to Muzaffar Shah I,  the founder of the Gujarat Sultanate. In the fifteenth century, under the powerful Gujarat Sultanate rulers, the Gohils, though they kept their title of Ghogha chiefs, retired to Umrala. At this time Ghogha was probably under a Muslim governor. At the beginning of the sixteenth century (1503) it was entirely a Muslim town 'of great traffic in a fat and wealthy land.' Ten years later (1513), it was a very large town and a good port dealing in merchandize of all kinds and loading ships for Malabar and Aden. In the struggles for mastery at sea between the Gujarat kings and the Portuguese (1507-1538),  Ghogha suffered. A strong and populous place of great trade surrounded by walls of brown stone, it was attacked and burnt by the Portuguese in 1531, and again, as it was beginning to recover, in 1546. Towards the close of the sixteenth century with the decay of Portuguese power, Ghogha seems to have regained its trade.

When taken in 1591 by Khan-i-Azam Mirza Kotaltash, one of Akbar's viceroys, Ghogha was a large, well-built port with many merchants and ships, the cargoes of which went in small boats to Cambay. It was reckoned part of Sorath and, besides port dues, yielded a yearly revenue of £1666 (666,560 dams). In 1612, on the advice of Khojah Nasar the Surat Governor, who praised its fine harbour and its trade with Cambay, the English gained leave to settle at Gogha. But the agent, Whittington, found it a poor town and no regular English factory was established. Two years later (1614), the Portuguese a third time destroyed Gogha, burning 120 trading boats and several ships, one of them the Rahimi, the great 1500 ton pilgrim ship. Following decline of Portuguese, the English were chief traders of the sea. With the Dutch, by raising Surat to be the chief port of Gujarat, the English injured the trade of the Cambay ports. Still during the seventeenth and for a few years of the eighteenth centuries, Gogha was the centre of a considerable traffic. The Portuguese boats met in its road and were convoyed to Goa by warships; and vessels belonging to the native merchants of Ahmedabad and Cambay sailed from Ghogha to south India and Arabia. Protected on the sea face by a stone fortification, and later on sheltered all round by a mud wall, with a local governor and a military force, Ghogha had a large number of traders, weavers, and sailors.

The eighteenth century was a time of decay. Trade fell off, and Ghogha, handed from one Muslim noble to another (1730-1751), taken by the Peshwa (1751-1755), recovered by the Nawab of Cambay (1755), and again (1764) taken by the Peshwa, was, under his managers, little able to compete with its pushing rival Bhavnagar. In 1803, when it came under British East India Company, the trade of Ghogha was almost gone. Later it was recovered somewhat under British rule and became part of Kathiawar Agency followed by Western India States Agency in 1924. When India became independent in 1947, it became part of Bhavnagar district in Saurashtra State which was later merged with Gujarat in 1960.

Stone Anchors of Ghogha
Gogha was the important port town during the medieval period and played as transit port between the ports of the upper part of the Gulf of Khambhat and rest of the ports along the Indian Ocean Countries. The discovery of various types of anchors suggests that  boats of different origin visited Gogha port. The most important find is an anchor with wide groove on the all four section is probably of Chinese origin. For the first time glazed ware has been found associated with the stone anchors suggest that these may be dated between the 10th and the 16th century AD. Such a large number of stone anchors in an inter-tidal zone suggests the correct description  provided in the Periplus of the Erythrenean Sea.

The stone anchors have been noticed close to the present lighthouse in the inter-tidal zone. Being in the high tidal range, the stone anchors that are lying in 5 to 10 m water depth during high tide get exposed during low tide. These stone anchors are found either partially buried or exposed on the gravel bed. The seabed at the finding spot of the anchor consisted of gravel and fine sand. The majority of the anchors are of Indo-Arabia type and one stone anchor falls in the category of composite type. The Indo-Arabia type anchors of typically made from a vertical stone block with often square section with two lower holes are rectangular/ square and an upper circular hole. Two anchors in the group of Indo-Arab type are having uniform vertical deep and wide groove on all the four faces of the anchor. The broken single composite anchor is made of a thin limestone block with two lower holes are square and two circular holes are placed randomly on upper side. The detail measurements and drawing could be completed just of 14 anchors  due to tidal time and muddy seabed and hence rest anchors were only photographed. Many stone anchors are fragmented in nature. Majority of the anchors are parted with lower 2 holes and sometimes holes also broken which might have been broken during manufacturing stage.  The raw material used for these anchors are hard basaltic, sedimentary and a few of conglomeratic material. A fragmentary anchor is the biggest anchor found from here. Only lower portion is surviving and is very similar to those reported from Mithi Virdi. There is a stone block without any holes noticed similar to the Indo-Arabia type anchor.

Oldest Mosque in India
The first companions of the Prophet Muhammad landed at Ghogha around the early seventh century and built a mosque here. This was the time when the Qibla (direction to be faced while praying salah) of the Muslims was Baitul Muqaddas (Jerusalem) instead of Mecca. For a brief period of 16 to 17 months, between 622 and 624 A.D., after the Hijrah (migration) to Medina, the Prophet Muhammad and his believers faced Jerusalem while praying salah between 610 to 623 A.D. This ancient mosque, locally known as Barwada Masjid or Juni (Old) Masjid, was built during this period and is one of the oldest mosques in India. Later, the prophet Muhammad received wahy (revelation) commanding him to change the orientation point from Jerusalem in the north to Mecca in the south. This mosque, therefore, predates all the other mosques in India whose mihrab face Mecca. It also bears the oldest Arabic inscription in India. The masjid falls under the care of Barwada Jamat.

Stone Inscription at Ghogha
1. The stone containing this inscription is raised under an Ambli tree grown on the side of the way leading to the shrine of Piranpir on the sea-beach at Gogha, a British port in the Gulf of Cambay on the east coast of Kathiavad. It contains five lines written in Arabic characters. It measures 18° X 15", and mentions the death of a martyr named Baba Taju-ud-din in A.H. 591, A.D. 1195. The stone 
is the common sandstone, but well preserved. The translation of that characters is,
"In the name of God, the merciful and compassionate.There is no god but God ; Mahomed is the prophet of God. Every creature which lives on the earth is subject to decay ; but the glorious and honourable countenance of thy Lord shall remain for ever. 
Baba Taju-ud-din, son of Badr-ud-din, honoured by men ; fortunate, martyred, the oppressed, forgiven (by God), migrated from this house of destruction to that of eternity, in the month of Rabi-ul-akhir A.H. 591."
 
2. The shrine of Hazrat Pir in which this inscription is found is situated on the seaside at Ghogha, a British port on the eastern coast of Kathiavad. It is cut into a white soft stone and has eight lines of Persian mixed with Arabic. The surface of the stone measiu-es 10" x 8". It refers to the building of a mosque by a Tandel (the head officer in a ship) named Bapuji in the year A.H. 1146, AD. 
1733, during the reign of Emperor Mahomed Shah of Dellii. The translation of that characters is, 
"In the name of God the merciful and compassionate : There is no god but God ; Mahomed is the prophet of God : 
Therefore invoke not any other therein together with God. Mahomed Sliah, the conqueror of the world, the favourite of fortune, the king 
of the world, the Khalif of God ; may God perpetuate his kingdom and nile ! This mosque was made by Tandel Bapuji, son of Musaji, a Khalif (deputy)of Kaderi Badrshah, son of Kazim Ali Mian Shah Syed, son of • * * in the year corresponding to that of the flight of Mahomed, the chosen ; may the blessing and peace of God be on him ! viz., in the month of Rabi-ul-awwal, A.H.1146.

3. The stone in which this inscription is cut is built up in the wall of the Idagah, in a suburb at the town of Gogha, called Mosampura. It is a white stone containing nine lines of mixed Persian and Arabic composition, of which several letters are clear enough to make them out. It mentions the building of the Idagah bv one Kamal Hamid in the time of 2iafar Khan in A.H. 777, A.D. 1375-76. The translation of that characters is, 
"In the name of God, the merciful and compassionate. And when we ap-pointed the holy house of iMukkah to be a place of resort for inankind and a place of security, and said take the station of Abraham for a place of prayer.In the time of the refuge of the great sun of the world and religion, the refuge of victory, the Sultan and the great Khan, viz., Zefer Khan, son of Vajih-ul-Mulk. Kamal Hamid, pilgrim of Mecca and Medina, slave, hoping for the mercy of God, made this place of worship for the faithful. May God bless him who comes here ! May he remember the expectant slave with the_blessing of safety.Dated the 15th of Rajab, A.H. 777.May the peace and blessing of God be on him."

4. This stone is raised near the mosque built near the house of one Dada MuUa on the way leading to the Gundi Gate at Gogha. It is a hard black stone witli a face measuring  1 7" x 14. The inscription appears to have been in Persian, as, with the exception of a few words, the whole of it has become undecipherable.There are in all nine hnes. It is dated A.H. 780, A.D. 1378-79. As many of the letters cannot be deciphered it is difficult to find out what it contains. The word "MuzeiFer" can be read, but it is doubtful. In the same line a name is distinctly read, which is Khan Anaj Mulamakan, A.H. 780.

Ghogha In AÍN I AKBARI

In the time of  Mughal period Ghogha Port was under the Emperor Akbar(14 October 1542  – 27 October 1605). In AÍN I AKBARI Part II ABUL FAZL ALLÁMI wrote that Mughal Empire got Revenue from Ghogah, (Gogo) exclusive port 666,560 Dáms. Further he mentioned Ghogha port as under,

"The ports of Ghogah* and Kambháyat (Cambay) are included in this Sarkár. The latter is a large city where merchants of divers kinds reside and wherein are fine buildings and much merchandise. Vessels sail from and trade to Ghogah. The cargoes are put into small ships called Táwari which transport them to Kambháyat"

"In the third district at the foot of the Satrúnjah (Shatrunjaya) hill is a large fort and on its summit, the fort of Pálithánah. Though in ruins, it deserves restoration. It is in great veneration with the Jains. The port of Ghogah (Gogo) is a dependency of this district. The island of Biram (Perim) was formerly the residence of the governor; it is 9 kos square and is a low rocky island in the midst of the sea. The Zamíndár is of the Gohel tribe. This district possesses 2,000 horse and 4,000 foot

Well Known Personalities of Ghogha
Ghogha has given a great contribution in progress of Bhavnagar State. Many Nagar from vadnagar moved to Ghogha, an ancient port on the Gulf of Combay (khanbhat)in the Dhandhuka Taluka of Ahmadabad about ten miles from Bhavnagar. It was a busy port on the western coast of India from which sailing goods far and wide across the Indian Ocean to Africa and the Parsian Gulf. The samaldas family had an unbroken connection with the Bhavnagar state for nearly hundred years. Lallubha's elder brother,Vithaldas, their father Samaldas and grandfather,Parmananddas had all served as Dewans of Bhavnagar State. Gaganvihari Lallubhai Mehta (1900–1974) was the ambassador of India to the United States from 1952 to 1958. He was awarded the Padma Bhushan in 1954 and the Padma Vibhushan in 1959. His forefathers are also from Ghogha

Ghogha's Nagar Served and Developed Bhavnagar as and when as under.
1. Parmananddas Ranchhoddas chief minister of Bhavnagar state during 1806-1817
2. Gaurishanka Udayshankar Oza (1805–1891) (also known as Gaga Oza) was chief minister of Bhavnagar state, India from 1850 to 1879. He was very well known and well respected for his keen statesmanship.
3. Samaldas Parmananddas served as chief minister of Bhavnagar state during 1879-1884
4. Vithaldas Samaldas chief minister of Bhavnagar state during 1884-1899
5. Vajeshankar Gaurishankar chief minister of Bhavnagar state during 1899-1902.

See also
  Kalpasar Tidal Energy Project
 RORO ferry service, Gujarat

References

Cities and towns in Bhavnagar district
Ports and harbours of Gujarat